Aron Flam (born 12 June 1978) is a Swedish writer, stand-up comedian, podcaster, and occasional actor.

Flam started his career in stand-up comedy in his hometown of Stockholm in 2007 and was awarded the "Rookie of the Year" award in 2009 at the Swedish stand-up gala. He was co-host of the podcast Till slut kommer någon att skratta alongside fellow Swedish comedians Soran Ismail and Petter Bristav. He was the host of SVT Play's political satire web series Folkets främsta företrädare.

Since 2016, Flam is hosting his own podcast, Dekonstruktiv kritik, in which he conducts interviews in Swedish or English with invited guests on a wide range of topics.

Early life and education
Flam was born in the Solna Municipality of Stockholm to Harry Flam, a professor of economics at the Institute for International Economic Studies at Stockholm University, and Eva Meyersohn. He is of Jewish origin and has spoken frequently on this in his stand-up comedy routines. Flam attended the prestigious Enskilda Gymnasiet in Stockholm, where he participated in the social science program. After high school, he attended Stockholm University and graduated with a bachelor's degree in film studies. He subsequently obtained a master's degree in financial economics at Stockholm University. Flam is together with his father also active in the reconstruction of the Jewish comedy scene in Sweden within the Israel Paideia framework.

Career

Stand-up 
Aron Flam debuted in 2007 as a stand-up comedian in the competition at the Stockholm Comedy Club, which he attended with his friend and colleague Jonatan Unge, with whom he had previously written the book Sista ordet: citat och fakta om döden. Flam won the competition and the following year, 2008, he won the award "Komikaze of the Year". The following year he became the winner in the category "Rookie of the Year" during the Swedish stand-up gala. He has performed at clubs including Stockholm Comedy Club, Norra Brunn, and the television show RAW.

Podcasts 
In October 2010, started Aron Flam podcast Till slut kommer någon att skratta (TSKNAS), along with comedian Soran Ismail and Petter Bristav. In January 2012, however, he left the podcast due to burnout, but later returned in March of the same year.

In spring 2015, Flam formed a stand-up tour called SEMST of Comedy (Super Titan Epic Mega Sweet of Comedy), together with comic colleagues Jonatan Unge, Branislav Pavlovic and Ahmed Berhan. The tour started in Malmö on 9 April 2015 and concluded in Stockholm on 3 May 2015.

Aron Flam also operates a stand-up club "Till slut kommer alla onekligen att skratta" ( "TSKAOS"), together with the comics Soran Ismail and Petter Bristav.

Dekonstruktiv kritik 
In January 2016, Flam started his own podcast, Dekonstruktiv kritik ("Deconstructive Criticism"), in which he conducts interviews in Swedish or English with an invited guest on a wide range of topics. Some of the topics are, or have been, considered sensitive, controversial or even taboo to examine or criticize in the public discourse in Sweden. Some recurring topics are free speech, drugs, immigration, feminism, socialism and Sweden during World War II. As of April 2022, 231 episodes have been produced. The podcast is published on several platforms like Acast, SoundCloud and YouTube and is (2017) considered one of the most financially successful podcasts in Sweden.

Film and television
In 2005, Flam appeared in the TV3 program Rivalerna as one of the 12 participants. He dropped out immediately, however, because he felt that the program was an "incompetent production."

He has also appeared in VAKNA! med The Voice and starred in the television program Grillad. In spring 2010, he starred in Nyheter24's comedy program "Någonting annat" alongside Soran Ismail.

Beside his stand-up career, Flam has also starred as an actor in the 2011 feature film Certain People by Levan Akin and Lisa Östberg and played Death in Michael Rendell's 2012 short film When the Man Comes Around.

Aron Flam is one of the writers for Kanal 5's Kristallen-winning program Betnér Direkt. The same year he was also the editor of Jag bombade, an anthology concerning life as a stand up comedian.

In autumn 2013, the first season of Flam's self-produced program Folkets främsta företrädare aired on SVT Play. Folkets främsta företrädare is an infotainment television series with satire on various parts of the Swedish government and similar topics. Flam speaks to the camera, together with others including David Druid and Henrik Dorsin. The program began its third season in autumn 2015, in a partially new format. The third season has longer episodes and is recorded weekly with a greater focus on news and current affairs.

Det här är en svensk tiger 

In 2020, Flam published a book titled Det här är en svensk tiger ("This is a Swedish Tiger") which addresses the official policies of Sweden during World War II. In the book, Flam claims that under the guise of neutrality Sweden assisted the German war effort intentionally and consistently. He casts Swedish efforts to save Jews from Nazi persecution as insignificant, and criticizes the appraisal of these efforts by many historians as highly exaggerated.

Swedish prosecutors seized the entire third print run of the book (2000 copies), claiming that the cover of the book contained an image of the symbol En svensk tiger, a tiger sporting Sweden's national colors of blue and yellow, infringed on the copyright if the image. The image was part of a war-time information campaign now owned by the Swedish Military Preparedness Museum (Beredskapsmuseet). The matter was presented to court on 24 September 2020, and ignited some debate in Swedish media on censorship and the boundaries of satire. Flam was found not guilty by the Swedish courts.

Bibliography

References

External links
 
  
 

1978 births
Swedish male comedians
Swedish screenwriters
Swedish male screenwriters
Jewish male comedians
Swedish libertarians
Living people
Swedish Jews
Stockholm University alumni
People educated at Enskilda Gymnasiet
21st-century Swedish comedians